Vicente Locaso (12 January 1909 – 4 April 1994) was an Argentine footballer who served as a forward.

He debuted for Club Atlético River Plate on August 26, 1928 against Sportivo Barracas in a 2-1 victory. It was Locaso who scored the first goal when the club turned professional in 1931 in a 1-0 victory against Atlanta. In a close game, in the 18th minute of the first half, Locaso took the ball near the area, after a couple of rebounds, and finished a cross, beating Mascheroni. At the end of the 1931-32 season he played his last competitive match in a loss to Boca Juniors 0-3, on January 6 of 1932 . He then joined Huracán and the following season joined Gimnasia de La Plata, but injury prevented him from playing, forcing him to retire.

References

1909 births
1994 deaths
Argentine accountants
Club de Gimnasia y Esgrima La Plata footballers
Club Atlético Huracán footballers
Club Atlético River Plate footballers
Argentine footballers
Association football forwards
Footballers from Buenos Aires